Misionarul is a newspaper issued by the Metropolis of Bessarabia in Chişinău.

History 

The first edition was printed on October 6, 1929. The first editor in chief was Vladimir Burjacovschi (May 23, 1891, Sănătăuca, Soroca County – 1959, Bucharest). Among the authors were: Efim Tighineanu, Episcopal Policarp, Constantin N. Tomescu, Vladimir Burjacovschi, Vasile Ţepordei, Marin Ionescu, Alexandru Scvoznicov, Sergiu Roşca, Constantin Chirică, V. Prisăcaru, Corneliu Grumăzescu, T. Gogoncea, I. D. Oporan, V. Harea, Spiru L. Gheorghiu, protosinghel Ieraclie, protodiacon Beladanu, ierodiacon Serafim Gheorghiu.

Bibliography 
 Chişinău. Enciclopedie. – Chişinău: Ed. Museum, 1997. – 576 p.
 Istoria Basarabiei. De la începuturi şi până în 1994. – București: Ed. Tempus, 1998. – 194 p.
 Nina Negru. Nu-l mai plângeţi pe acela Care veşnic singur nu-i... // Lit. şi Arta. – 1994. – 19 mai. – P. 8.

Footnotes

External links
  Vasile Secrieru, Revista "Misionarul" – repere istorice

Publications established in 1929
Romanian-language newspapers
Newspapers published in Moldova
Metropolis of Bessarabia
Mass media in Chișinău